Sir Thomas Trevor, 1st Baronet ( – 5 February 1676) was a Welsh politician who sat in the House of Commons of England variously between 1640 and 1648.

Life
Trevor was the son of  Sir Thomas Trevor of Trevalyn Denbighs, Lord Baron of the Exchequer. He was an auditor for Duchy of Lancaster in 1640, In November 1640, he was returned as  Member of Parliament for Monmouth in the Long Parliament.  There was a double return with  William Watkins which was not resolved immediately. When  some of the voters petitioned against the result, his opponent was forced to stop sitting as an MP until the dispute could be resolved. Meanwhile, he has created a baronet (of Enfield in Middlesex) on 11 August 1641.  His election was finally declared void in November 1644. By this time, Parliament had suspended by-elections to fill vacancies because of the Civil War, and when they resumed Trevor was instead elected MP for Tregony in 1647. He was, however, excluded from the Commons in Pride's Purge the following December.

After the Restoration, Trevor was made a Knight of the Bath at the coronation of Charles II. He died in February 1676.

Family
Trevor married c.1632 Anne Jenner, daughter of Robert Jenner, a prosperous London silver merchant who had bought estates in Wiltshire. He married secondly Mary, daughter of Samuel Hortrey of Kew. He had no children and the baronetcy became extinct on his death. His estates passed to Sir Charles Wheler, grandson of Mary, a sister of Sir Thomas Trevor's father.

References

Further reading

|-

1610s births
1676 deaths
Baronets in the Baronetage of England
Members of the pre-1707 English Parliament for constituencies in Cornwall
Members of the Parliament of England (pre-1707)